Cithna is a genus of sea snails, marine gastropod mollusks in the family Liotiidae.

Species
Species within the genus Cithna include:
 Cithna globosa A. Adams, 1863
 Cithna margaritifera (R. B. Watson, 1880)
 † Cithna pilsbryi Richards 1947 
 Cithna spirata A. Adams, 1863

Synonyms
 Cithna carinata Jeffreys, 1883 is a synonym of Haloceras carinata (Jeffreys, 1883)
 Cithna cingulata Verrill, 1884  is a synonym of Haloceras cingulata (Verrill, 1884)
 Cithna jeffreysi (Dautzenberg, 1889) is a synonym of Benthonella tenella (Jeffreys, 1869)
 Cithna marshalli Sykes, 1925 is a synonym of Iphitus marshalli (Sykes, 1925)
 Cithna naticiformis Jeffreys, 1883 is a synonym of Choristella nofronii McLean, 1992
 Cithna tenella (Jeffreys, 1869): synonym of Benthonella tenella (Jeffreys, 1869)

References

 
Liotiidae